During the first half of the 20th century, many navies constructed or planned to build battlecruisers: large capital ships with greater speed but less armor than dreadnought battleships. In the same year, Germany responded with its own battlecruiser, . Over the next decade, Britain and Germany built an additional twelve and six battlecruisers, respectively. Two countries considered acquiring battlecruisers in this time, but chose not to: France looked at several battlecruiser design studies in 1913 and 1914, and the United States ordered six s in 1916 that were never built.

The British and German battlecruisers were used extensively during World War I between 1914 and 1918, including in the Battles of Heligoland Bight and Dogger Bank, and most famously in the Battle of Jutland on 31 May and 1 June 1916, where one German and three British battlecruisers were sunk. The Japanese battlecruisers did not see action during the war, as the German naval presence in the Pacific was destroyed by the British in the early months of the war. At the end of the war, the German High Seas Fleet was interned and subsequently scuttled in Scapa Flow.

In the immediate aftermath of World War I, Britain, Japan, and the United States all considered new battlecruiser construction, including the British G3 class, the Japanese , and a revised version of the American Lexingtons. In the interest of avoiding another crippling naval arms race, the three countries, along with France and Italy, signed the Washington Naval Treaty in 1922, which included a moratorium on new capital ship construction. A clause in the treaty, however, gave the British, Japanese, and Americans a chance to convert several of their battlecruisers into aircraft carriers. Only a handful of battlecruisers survived the arms limitation regime. In the 1930s, several navies considered new "cruiser killer" battlecruisers, including Germany's , the Dutch Design 1047, and the Soviet . The outbreak of World War II in September 1939 put a halt to all these plans.

During the war, the surviving battlecruisers saw extensive action, and many were sunk. The four Japanese Kongō-class ships had been rebuilt as fast battleships in the 1930s, but all were sunk during the conflict. The only other battlecruiser in existence at the end of the Second World War was the ex-German , which had been transferred to Turkey during the First World War and served as Yavuz Sultan Selim.

Several new wartime classes were proposed, including the American  and the Japanese Design B-65 class. The Alaskas were officially classified as "large cruisers", but many naval historians refer to them as battlecruisers. Only two of the American ships were built before the end of the war. In the postwar drawdown of forces, Renown and the two Alaskas were withdrawn from service and eventually scrapped; Yavuz Sultan Selim, the last surviving battlecruiser in the world, lingered on until the early 1970s, when she too was sent to the shipbreakers. Only one country, the Soviet Union, considered building battlecruisers after the war. The three  ships, championed by Joseph Stalin, were laid down in the early 1950s, but were cancelled after his death in 1953. However, in the 1970s, the Soviet Union began the construction of a class of very large guided missile cruisers, much larger than any other surface combatant built since the Second World War.

Key 

The list of battlecruiser classes includes all battlecruisers listed in chronological order by commission. Classes which did not enter service are listed by the date of cancellation or last work on the project.

Great Britain

Germany

Japan

Russia/Soviet Union

United States

Australia

France

Netherlands

Austro-Hungarian Empire

See also 

 List of battleships
 List of cruisers
 List of ships of the Second World War
 List of cruisers of the Second World War
 List of battlecruisers of the Second World War

Footnotes 

Notes

Citations

References 
 
 
 
 
 
 
 
 
 
 
 
 
 
 Jackson, Robert (2000). The World's Great Battleships. Brown Books. 
 
 
 McCurtie, Francis (1989) [1945]. Jane's Fighting Ships of World War II. London: Bracken Books. 
 
 
 
 
 
 
 Schom, Alan (2004). The Eagle and the Rising Sun; The Japanese-American War, 1941–1943. Norton & Company. 
 
 Stille, Mark (2008). Imperial Japanese Navy Battleship 1941–1945. Oxford: Osprey Publishing.